Werner Fischer (born November 7, 1939 in Epfenbach, Baden) is a Doctor of mechanical engineering and was between 1980 and 1990 Vice-President and between 1990 and 2005 President of the University of Applied Sciences in Karlsruhe in Germany.

Werner Fischer received two honorary degrees in 1998:
  University of Tiflis
  Nottingham Trent University for his engagement in the cooperation of European  Universities

In 2005 Fischer gets the Federal Cross of Merit of the Federal Republic of Germany.

Fischer is married and has three sons. The oldest is the politician Axel Fischer, the second the politician and pastor Lutz Fischer-Lamprecht.

External links 
http://www.hs-karlsruhe.de/servlet/PB/menu/1007254_pcont_l1/content.html (German!)
Website about Re-Election as President in 2002 on web.archive.org

1939 births
Living people
People from Rhein-Neckar-Kreis
People from the Republic of Baden
Academic staff of the Karlsruhe Institute of Technology
Recipients of the Cross of the Order of Merit of the Federal Republic of Germany